Caroline Jennifer Hogg  (born 18 April 1942) is a former Australian politician for the Labor Party. She was a member of the Victorian Legislative Council from 1982 to 1996 and a minister in the governments of John Cain and Joan Kirner.

Born Caroline Jennifer Kluht in Somerset, England, she emigrated to Australia in 1950 with her mother. She trained to become a teacher and in 1967, married Bob Hogg, who later became national secretary of the ALP. They had a son and a daughter.

Caroline Hogg worked as a teacher at Fitzroy High School for fifteen years and became an executive member of the Victorian Secondary Teachers Association. She was elected to Collingwood City Council in 1970 and was mayor from 1978 to 1979. In 1982 she was elected to a seat in Melbourne North Province of the Legislative Council and three years later she was appointed Minister of Community Services. She later served as Minister for Education, Minister for Health and Minister for Ethnic, Municipal and Community Affairs.

Since leaving politics, she has been a board member of organisations such as Beyond Blue, the Infertility Authority and the Victorian Grants Commission. Her marriage to Bob Hogg ended in 1996 and she has since remarried.

References

1942 births
Living people
Members of the Victorian Legislative Council
Australian Labor Party members of the Parliament of Victoria
Officers of the Order of Australia
Politicians from Melbourne
Victoria (Australia) local councillors
English emigrants to Australia
Australian schoolteachers
People from Somerset
University of Adelaide alumni
Women members of the Victorian Legislative Council
Women mayors of places in Victoria (Australia)
Women local councillors in Australia
Mayors of places in Victoria (Australia)